Gina Böttcher (born 11 April 2001) is a German Paralympic swimmer who competes in international elite competitions. She is a six-time European medalist. She has competed at the 2020 Summer Paralympics but did not medal.

References

External links
 
 
  

2001 births
Living people
German female medley swimmers
German female freestyle swimmers
Paralympic swimmers of Germany
Swimmers at the 2020 Summer Paralympics
Medalists at the World Para Swimming European Championships
S4-classified Paralympic swimmers
Sportspeople from Brandenburg an der Havel
Sportspeople from Potsdam
21st-century German women